Cittanova is a comune (municipality) in the Metropolitan City of Reggio Calabria in the Italian region Calabria, located about  southwest of Catanzaro and about  northeast of Reggio Calabria.

Located on the slopes of Aspromonte and facing the Gioia Tauro plain, it is characterized by the presence of numerous churches and a public park which extends for 2.65 hectares (6.55 ac).

Geography

The town is located at the foot of the Aspromonte, on alluvial quaternary soils, consisting of incoherent sands and gravels that cover the large terraces sloping down towards the Gulf of Gioia. Cittanova dominates the Gioia Tauro plain from the highest terrace, the one bordering the massif of the Serre Calabresi, almost in contact between the two lithological formations: alluvial and crystalline.

This geological conformation favors the propagation of earthquakes, as the incoherence of the alluvial cover is increased during earthquakes by the contiguous and underlying crystalline formation. The territory of Cittanova is crossed by the homonymous fault which is part of the Serre-Aspromonte fault system, 30 kilometers long and still active.

The altitude referring to the town hall building is 400 meters above mean sea level, in the municipal area the minimum altitude reaches 77 m above mean sea level while the maximum reaches 996 meters. The surface is 61.98 km²  (about 65% in flat land planted with olive trees and 35% in mountainous wooded land and natural pastures).

The main water courses are the torrents Serra and Vacale.

Main peaks: Melìa plateau (m. 1,000), Zomaro (m. 920) and Mount Cuculo (m. 725).

Zomaro is located on the Melìa plateau, inside the Aspromonte National Park.
The flora that characterizes it is mainly composed of beeches, holm oaks, firs and brooms. Also present is Woodwardia radicans, an ancient giant fern which survived the Cenozoic. The fauna has numerous wild boars as well as squirrels, badgers, foxes, owls and black kites. The plateau is also rich in spring waters.

Cittanova borders the following municipalities: Antonimina, Canolo, Ciminà, Gerace, Melicucco, Molochio, Polistena, Rizziconi, Rosarno, San Giorgio Morgeto and Taurianova.

Climate 
The climate is Mediterranean. The plain of Gioia, open to the sea but sheltered from the winds, increases the humidity, making the land particularly fertile.

History 
Cittanova (Italian for "New City") was born in 1618, in the wake of the disastrous earthquake of 1616, as the Nuovo Casale di Curtuladi ("New Hamlet of Curtuladi"), then Casalnuovo upgraded to city status as Cittanova.
 
The city was all but demolished in the great earthquake of 1783 that damaged Messina.

Demographics

Twin towns 
 Ivangorod, Russia
 Caltanissetta, Italy
 Vimodrone, Italy

References

External links 

 Official website
 Cittanova.Com
 CittanovaOnLine.It

Populated places established in 1618
Cities and towns in Calabria
1618 establishments in Italy